William Seale was an American historian and author whose primary interest was in historic architecture, particularly that of the White House, state capitols, and historic governors' mansions, who was "instrumental in preserving many historic structures across the country", including private homes.  In 1983, he founded the scholarly journal White House History, which he edited for the White House Historical Association until his death.  

Seale was born and raised in Beaumont, Texas, the son of William Seale, a contractor who studied historic building practices, and Eugenia Brooks Seale, who "had an eye for interiors" and furnishings. He attended Southwestern University (BA 1961) and Duke University (MA 1964 and PhD 1965). He taught for several years at Lamar University, the University of Houston, the University of South Carolina, and Columbia University. In 1965, he moved to Washington, D. C., and the following year married Lucinda Smith of Alexandria, Virginia.  The couple lived in Alexandria and had two sons.

From 1973 to 1974, Seale was curator of cultural history at the Smithsonian Institution. He then became an independent scholar, publishing many books and essays, and frequently appearing on C-SPAN to discuss the history and preservation of significant American buildings.

His restoration projects include the state capitols of Michigan, Ohio, Kansas, Florida, Mississippi, Alabama, and historical consultation on the capitols of Minnesota, Alaska, and New Jersey. Historic houses include Dodona Manor, the Gen. George C. Marshall House, Leesburg, Virginia; Ten Chimneys, home of Alfred Lunt and Lynn Fontanne; Genesee Depot, Wisconsin; George Eastman House, Rochester, New York; Ximenez-Fatio House, St. Augustine, Florida; Old Governor's Mansion (Milledgeville, Georgia); and many others over a period of twenty-five years.

In 2013 he served as a consultant and panelist for the Cable-Satellite Public Affairs Network (C-SPAN) production First Ladies: Influence and Image, which ran for two seasons.First Lady - Julia Grant | C-SPAN First Ladies: Influence & Image

On November 21, 2019, he died at his home in Dallas, Texas, following a long illness.

Bibliography
An incomplete list of works written by William Seale:
 Texas Riverman: The Life and Times of Captain Andrew Smyth (University of Texas Press, 1966)
 Sam Houston’s Wife: A Biography of Margaret Lea Houston (University of Oklahoma Press, 1970)
 Texas in Our Time (Hendrick-Long, 1972)
 The Tasteful Interlude: American Interiors Through the Camera’s Eye (Praeger Publishers, 1975)
 Temples of Democracy: The State Capitols of the USA (Harcourt 1976)
 Courthouse (Bonanza, 1977)
 Restoration of the Kentucky Governor’s Mansion: A History (Harmony House, 1984)
 The Virginia Governor’s Mansion: A History, with Henry-Russell Hitchcock (Virginia State Archives,, 1985)
 The President’s House: A History, 2 vols. (White House Historical Association, 1986 and 2008)
 Recreating the Historic House Interior (American Association for State and Local History Press, 1988)'
 Restoration of the Michigan Capitol, State of Michigan, Kent State University Press, 1988),  with Erik Kvalsvik
 Domestic Views: Historic Houses of the Colonial Dames of America (American Institute of Architects, 1992)
 Of Houses and Time: Personal History of the National Trust Houses (Abrams, 1992)
 Michigan’s Capitol (University of Michigan Press, 1995)
 The White House Garden (White House Historical Association, 1996)
 Domes of America, with Eric Oxendorf (Pomegranate Press, 1998)
 The Alexandria Library Company: A History (Alexandria Library Company, 2001)
 Alexandria: Historic Guide (City of Alexandria, Va., 2003)
 The White House: History of an American Idea (White House Historical Association, 2005)
 The Imperial Season: America’s Capital in the Time of the First Ambassadors, 1893–1918 (Smithsonian Press, 2013)
 Blair House:  The President's Guest House (2016) 
 A White House of Stone'' (2017)

References

External links 
 The White House Historical Association 
 Recipient of 2008 Alexandria History Award
 Keynote address at Alexandria Historic Preservation Conference and Town Meeting. May 4, 2007
 An interview with William Seale in CRM: The Journal of Heritage Stewardship, Summer 2004

C-SPAN Q&A interview with Seale, December 14, 2008

American architectural historians
American architecture writers
American male non-fiction writers
Lamar University people
Duke University alumni
Southwestern University alumni
United States presidential history
1939 births
2019 deaths